A Soundtrack for the Wheel of Time is a music album inspired by Robert Jordan's bestselling fantasy book series The Wheel of Time.  It was performed, produced, and written by Robert Berry and released in 2001.  The soundtrack is an extension to the music originally produced by Robert Berry and Leif Sorbye for use as part of The Wheel of Time video game, released in 1999.

Track listing
"A Theme For The Wheel Of Time"
"Return To Emonds Field"
"Song For Moiraine"
"Traveling The Ways"
"Spears And Buckler"
"Dream Walker"
"The Knowledge Of The Wise Ones"
"The Winespring Reel"
"The Halls Of Tar Valon"
"Search For The Black Ajah"
"Ladies Of The Tower"
"The Game Of Houses"
"Voyage Of The Sea Folk"
"Heart Of The Wolf"
"Journey Through The Waste"
"Lan The Warder" 
"March Of The Trollocs"
"Rand's Theme (Fanfare For The Dragon Reborn)"
"The Aiel Approach (Dahl Of A Chant)"

External links
Amazon.com

Music based on novels
2001 soundtrack albums